

Mythologies by region

Africa

Bantu mythology

Central Africa
Baluba mythology
Bushongo mythology
Kongo mythology
Lugbara mythology
Mbuti mythology

East Africa

Dinka mythology
Kalenjin mythology
Lotuko mythology
Maasai mythology
Somali mythology

North Africa
Berber mythology
Egyptian mythology

Southern Africa

Lozi mythology 
Malagasy mythology
San mythology
Tumbuka mythology 
Zulu mythology

West Africa

Akan mythology
Dahomean mythology
Dogon mythology
Efik mythology
Igbo mythology
Serer mythology
Urhobo mythology 
Yoruba mythology

African Diasporic

Candomblé
Hoodoo
Kumina
Obeah
Palo
Quimbanda
Santería
Umbanda
Vodou

Asia
https://en.wikipedia.org/wiki/Assianism

Caucasus
Armenian mythology
Circassian mythology
Georgian mythology
Assianism
Ossetian mythology
Vainakh mythology
Azerbaijani mythology

Central Asia
Scythian mythology

East Asia
Ainu mythology
Bai mythology
Chinese mythology
Japanese mythology
Korean mythology
Manchu mythology
Mongolian mythology
Qiang mythology
Ryukyuan mythology
Tibetan mythology

North Asia
Siberian mythology 
Turkic mythology

South Asia
Buddhist mythology
Hindu mythology
Ayyavazhi mythology
Tamil mythology
Vedic mythology
Romani mythology

Southeast Asia
Burmese mythology
Indonesian mythology
Balinese mythology
Malaysian mythology
Meitei mythology
Philippine mythology
Vietnamese mythology
Thai mythology

West Asia / Middle East

Abrahamic mythology
Christian mythology
Islamic mythology
Jewish mythology
Elamite mythology
Hittite mythology
Iranian mythology
Kurdish mythology
Talysh mythology
Persian mythology
Mesopotamian myths
Babylonian mythology
Sumerian mythology
Semitic mythology
Arabian mythology
Canaanite mythology

Oceania
Australian Aboriginal mythology
Melanesian mythology
Fijian mythology
Papuan mythology
Micronesian mythology
Polynesian mythology
Hawaiian mythology
Mangarevan mythology
Māori mythology
Rapa Nui mythology
Samoan mythology
Tahitian mythology

Europe

Eastern Europe
Baltic mythology
Latvian mythology
Lithuanian mythology
Prussian mythology
Hungarian mythology
Paleo-Balkan mythology
Albanian mythology
Dacian religion
Illyrian mythology
Thracian religion
Slavic mythology

Northern Europe

Proto-Uralic mythology
Komi mythology
Finnic mythology
Estonian mythology
Finnish mythology
Sami mythology
Germanic mythology
Anglo-Saxon mythology
Continental Germanic mythology
English mythology
Frankish mythology
Norse mythology

Southern Europe
Greek mythology
Roman mythology

Western Europe
 
Basque mythology
Celtic mythology
Brythonic mythology
Breton mythology
Cornish mythology
Welsh mythology
Cantabrian mythology
Goidelic (Gaelic) mythology
Irish mythology
Manx mythology
Scottish mythology
Lusitanian mythology
Spanish mythology

Americas

North America
Abenaki mythology
Blackfoot mythology
Cherokee mythology
Choctaw mythology
Creek mythology
Crow mythology
Haida mythology
Hopi mythology
Inuit mythology
Iroquois mythology
Lakota mythology
Navajo mythology
Nuu-chah-nulth mythology
Ohlone mythology
Pawnee mythology
Tsimshian mythology
Zuni mythology
Maya mythology
Mixtec mythology
Olmec mythology
Talamancan mythology
Zapotec mythology

Central America
Aztec mythology
Haitian mythology

South America
Brazilian mythology
Chilote mythology
Guarani mythology
Inca mythology
Mapuche mythology
Muisca mythology

Mythologies by religion

Buddhist mythology
Christian mythology
Hindu mythology
Islamic mythology
Jewish mythology
Meitei mythology
Greek mythology
Wiccan deities
Gnostic mythology

Mythologies by time period
Ancient mythologies by period of first attestation.

Bronze Age
Hindu mythology
Canaanite mythology
Chinese mythology
Egyptian mythology
Hittite mythology
Hurrian mythology
Persian mythology
Proto-Indo-European mythology
Proto-Indo-Iranian mythology

Iron Age
Celtic mythology
Classical mythology
Greek mythology
Roman mythology
Etruscan mythology
Germanic mythology
Anglo-Saxon mythology
Norse mythology

Late Antiquity
Arabian mythology
Slavic mythology

Fictional mythologies

List of fictional deities
Cthulhu Mythos
Glorantha
William Blake's mythology
J.R.R. Tolkien's Middle-earth
Discworld

See also

List of creation myths
List of legendary creatures by type
List of mythology books and sources
List of mythological objects
List of culture heroes
List of world folk-epics
Lists of deities
Lists of legendary creatures
National myth
Mythopoeia

Mythologies